Ek Adhuri Kahani is 1972 Hindi language movie directed by Mrinal Sen, starring Utpal Dutt, Shekhar Chatterjee, Vivek Chatterjee, Aarti Bhattacharya, Shyam and Shobha Sen. It was based on a Bengali story, Gotrantar by Subodh Ghosh.

References

External links 
 

1972 films
1970s Hindi-language films
Films directed by Mrinal Sen
Films based on short fiction